Abulak is a martyr and saint of the Coptic Church.

Abulak was martyred with some two hundred companions.

Their feast day is June 9.

References

Sources
 Holweck, F. G. A Biographical Dictionary of the Saints. St. Louis, MO: B. Herder Book Co. 1924.

Christian saints in unknown century
Year of birth missing
Year of death missing
Coptic Orthodox saints